The 2010–11 Rain or Shine Elasto Painters season was the fifth season of the franchise in the Philippine Basketball Association (PBA).

Key dates
August 29: The 2010 PBA Draft took place in Market! Market!, Fort Bonifacio, Taguig.

Draft picks

Roster

Philippine Cup

Eliminations

Standings

Commissioner's Cup

Eliminations

Standings

Governors Cup

Eliminations

Standings

Semifinals

Standings

Transactions

Pre-season

Trades

Free agents

Additions

Subtractions

Philippine Cup

Trades

Imports recruited

References

Rain or Shine Elasto Painters seasons
Rain Or Shine